Toshihiko Sasano (born 2 November 1911, date of death unknown) was a Japanese gymnast. He competed in three events at the 1932 Summer Olympics.

References

1911 births
Year of death missing
Japanese male artistic gymnasts
Olympic gymnasts of Japan
Gymnasts at the 1932 Summer Olympics
Place of birth missing
20th-century Japanese people